Interest bearing notes refers to a grouping of Civil War era paper money-related emissions of the US Treasury.  The grouping includes the one- and two-year notes authorized by the Act of March 3, 1863, which bore interest at five percent per annum, were a legal tender at face value, and were issued in denominations of $10, $20, $50, $100, $500 and $1000.  The grouping also frequently includes the early civil war treasury notes which matured in either sixty days or two years and bore interest at six percent and the seven-thirties which matured in three years and bore interest at 7.3 percent—though both of these latter issues lacked legal tender status.  Reference texts used by currency collectors will also sometimes include compound interest treasury notes and Refunding Certificates in this grouping as well.

Denominational set of interest bearing notes 
Images are courtesy of the National Numismatic Collection at the National Museum of American History (Smithsonian Institution).

Footnotes

Notes

References

Interest-bearing instruments
Currency lists
Historical currencies of the United States
Paper money of the United States
Banknotes of the United States